Brand is a municipality in the district of Tirschenreuth in Bavaria, Germany.

Notable people
Max Reger (1873–1916), composer, pianist and conductor

References

Tirschenreuth (district)